Werner Hollweg (13 September 1936 in Solingen - 1 January 2007 in Freiburg im Breisgau) was a German operatic tenor. He is best known for his interpretation of Mozart's operas. Hollweg died from amyotrophic lateral sclerosis.

References 

1936 births
2007 deaths
People from Solingen
Neurological disease deaths in Germany
Deaths from motor neuron disease
German operatic tenors
20th-century German male  opera singers